Adinda Noviana Sari N. Thomas, S.I.Kom., or better known as Adinda Thomas (born 8 August 1993) is an Indonesian actress, model, entrepreneur and singer. Adinda made her debut in acting by playing Mini in the soap opera Ibrahim Anak Betawi in 2013. Then, in 2015, she played a role in her first film, namely Youtubers. Adinda became widely known thanks to her appearances in the soap opera Super Dede (2015) and also the sitcom The East (2017–2019).

Career

Early career 
Adinda's desire to become an artist has been raised since childhood. While at school, his family had experienced financial problems which forced him to help his parents to earn money. His father at that time had to work as a newsagent and he helped sell. To supplement her income, Adinda also sells toys and flowers on campuses that hold graduations. In these conditions he often gets insults from people around him. Dinda admitted that this was the reason for her desire to enter the world of entertainment.

Adinda has been a model and has participated in fashion shows since elementary school. With the support of her parents, she entered a modeling agency. Entering junior high school, he has a new hobby, namely playing a motorcycle. Due to frequent falls and leaving many scars, he was forced to quit the world of modelling. After he finished, Dinda became interested in the world of singing. She once composed a song when she was in high school.

After graduating from high school, Adinda went to Jakarta to study at the London School of Public Relations. In his early college years, he admitted that he often skipped classes to go to castings because he had to earn money for college. According to him, by working in the entertainment world, he can divide his time between work and college. For six months, his casting always failed, until at the end of 2013, thanks to the help of friends, he was invited to enter the entertainment world for the first time. Early in his career, he played in the soap opera Ibrahim Anak Betawi.

2014–2015: Television film and debut film 
In 2014, he focused on acting by starring in many FTV titles. This makes Dinda's lectures fall apart. He said he was tempted after being able to get money from his own hard work.

In 2015, Dinda played in her first feature film entitled Youtubers by Kemal Palevi and Jovial da Lopez. Shortly after the film, he was entrusted with being the main character in a film starring mostly Extravaganza alumni entitled The Wedding & Bebek Betutu. She also played in the soap opera Super Dede as Dinda. During filming for soap operas, he admitted that it was quite difficult to divide her time between filming and studying. At the end of 2015, Dinda tried to sit on the director's bench by directing a short film called Mother. He admitted that he asked for directing input from Monty Tiwa, who had directed him when he starred in the film The Giant from Jogja. He also played in the musical drama television series NET. titled Stereo.

2016–present: The East, KKN di Desa Penari, and Business 
In 2016, Adinda starred in 2 feature films. He played the role of Letisha in the film The Giant from Jogja produced by StarVision and played the role of Gendis in the film Maju Kena Mundur Kena Returns produced by MVP Pictures.

From 2017 to 2019, Adinda played in the NET TV sitcom. titled The East as Vira, a production assistant who is sensitive to various things.

In 2019, Adinda played the character Widya in a horror film based on the story "KKN di Desa Penari" by a Twitter user named SimpleMan. This film was produced by MD Pictures with the same title and is planned to be released in 2022. In this film, Adinda is required to attend special training to be able to interact with snakes for shooting needs. In 2020, he starred in the Indonesian-Malaysian collaboration film titled First Journey by Arief Malinmudo which premiered at the Jogja-NETPAC Asian Film Festival 2021. In mid-2021, Dinda starred in a web series produced by Daihatsu entitled Move, directed by Kuntz Agus. She played Indah, opposite Tarra Budiman as Nico. Then, she starred in the third season of a web series produced by Indonesian People's Bank (BRI) titled Pakai Hati. Adinda also starred in an independent film by Richard Oh entitled Waiting for Mother which will be shown on KlikFilm at the end of 2021.

Apart from having a career in the entertainment world, Adinda has also developed two businesses. Langit Tak Beratap, an open-air event that is planned to be developed into a limited liability company, and Paraoel, a clothing business.

Filmography

Films 

Information

Serial web

Television series

Television films 
 Cantik-Cantik Kok Kuli (2014) 
 Delivery Order (Bukan Salah Jodoh) (2014) 
 Hey Aku Love Kamu (2014) 
 Pembantu Tak Pernah Ingkar Janji (2014) 
 Terjebak Cinta Cewek Culun (2014) 
 Cintaku Selebar Tanah Babe (2014) 
 Pencopet Cantik (2014) 
 Jodohku di Tangan Babeh (2014) 
 Balada Jomblo Metropolitan (2014) 
 Service TV Jalan Cinta (2014)
 Unyu-Unyu Tukang Balon (2014)
 Romantika Supir Cantik (2014) 
 Kesuntik Cinta Dokter Cantik (2014) 
 Satpam Butet Penjaga Hati (2015)
 Saodah Hanya Kau Cintaku (2015)
 Duyung Mencari Cinta (2015) 
 Queen of Comblang (2017) 
 Ada Cinta di Atas Genteng (2017)
 My Secret Admirer (2017) 
 Ditikung Cinta Comblang (2017) 
 Ojek in Love (2017) 
 Berita Cinta dari Cinta (2017) 
 Mantan's Wedding Bikin Keki (2017) 
 Keblinger Mas Ganteng di Anyer (2018)

Discography

Singles 
 "Hilang" (2019) with rumahsakit

Songs sung on Stereo 
 "Tentang Aku" (Jingga)
 "Kecewa" (Bunga Citra Lestari)
 "Ada Cinta" (Bening)
 "Senang Bersamamu" (Naif) with Pradikta Wicaksono
 "Jangan Kau Henti" (Lingua) with Pradikta Wicaksono

References

External links 

 
 

Indonesian actresses
Indonesian film actresses
Indonesian models
Indonesian singers
People from Bandung
Living people
1993 births